Trade Your Love is a 2019 South Korean romantic comedy film directed by Park Ho-chan and Park Soo-jin. It stars Kim Dong-wook and Ko Sung-hee.

Plot 
Sung-seok and Hae-joo meet at a blind date and decide to enter into a contract marriage to get what they want.

Cast
Kim Dong-wook as Sung-seok
Ko Sung-hee as Hae-joo
Hwang Bo-ra as Song Mi-yeon
Kim Eui-sung as Captain Chae
Im Ye-jin as Hae-joo's mother
Yum Jung-ah as Mrs. Cheon
Choi Go as Park Hee-ro
Lee Chae-eun as Oh Hye-jin 
Jo Woo-jin as Section chief Seo
Kang Shin-chul as Lee Jae-yeong
Son Ji-hyun as Kim Sin-ah
Kim Sun-young as Jo Soo-jeong
Yoo Seung-mok as Coach
Lee Jun-hyeok as Wedding studio photographer

References

External links

2019 films
2019 romantic comedy films
South Korean romantic comedy films
2010s Korean-language films
2010s South Korean films